A List of Czechoslovakian films of the 1960s.

References 

1960s
Czech
Films